= National Youth Parliament (Ghana) =

The National Youth Parliament concept in Ghana is to provide a single formalized youth structure at the district, regional and national levels for the youth to air their frustrations, deliberate on matters of importance to youth development, and hold duty bearers accountable. it is basically aimed at providing the platform to mobilize the youth for action through providing accountability, transparency and equitable society for the ready youth.

The National Youth Authority aims at establishing youth parliaments in all Metropolitan, Municipal and District Assemblies (MMDAs) of the Region and this is geared towards providing the political space for the youth to participate effectively in the decision making process in the various local government structures.

== Composition and structure of the National Youth Parliament ==
The membership of the Youth Parliament shall be as much as practicable opened to both in-school and out of school youth in the country base on the level he/she falls under. The Youth Parliament shall have various compositions in the parliament at each levels as follows:

1. 2nd Cycle Institutions Youth Parliament: The minimum number of members in the each 2nd Cycle Institution Youth Parliament shall be 50 and a maximum of 150 and it shall be opened to all interested students of each school or institutions (public and private) who shall form the Youth Parliament in the various schools. Each of the Student Clubs/Associations in every school shall have two (2) of its leaders (preferably the President and Secretary) as members representing them in the Youth Parliament. All female Class Prefects or Course Representatives in each school shall serve as automatic members to the Youth Parliament in the school.
2. Tertiary Institutions Youth Parliament: The minimum number of members in each Tertiary Institution Youth Parliament shall be 50 and a maximum of 150 and shall be opened to all interested students of each school or institutions (public and private) who shall form the Youth Parliament in the various schools. Each of the Student Clubs/Associations in every school shall have three (3) of its leaders (preferably the President, Secretary and Women Commissioner) as members representing them in the Youth Parliament.
3. District/ Municipal/Metropolitan (MMDAs) Youth Parliament: The minimum number of members in each District, Municipal and Metropolitan Youth Parliament shall be 30 and a maximum of 150. seven (7) District leaders of Ghana Youth Federation formed by NYA, ten (10) other members of Active Youth focused or Youth Led groups registered as District Based groups with NYA in the district shall be part of the house at this level. These members shall have 5 males and 5 females. Unless otherwise provided, Active Youth groups shall mean groups that submit Quarterly, Bi-quarterly, Mid-year and End of Year reports of activities carried out and meetings organized for members involving NYA.
4. Regional Youth Parliament: The minimum number of members in each Regional Youth Parliament shall be 50 and a maximum of 200. five (5) leaders of all District/Municipal/Metropolitan Youth Parliaments (thus Speaker, Majority and Minority Leaders and Chief Whips of both caucuses) in the region shall be members of each Regional Youth Parliament. seven (7) Regional Leaders of Ghana Youth Federation formed by NYA and ten (10) other members of Active Youth focused or Youth Led groups registered as Regional Based groups with NYA in the region shall be part of the Regional Youth Parliament.
5. National Youth Parliament: The National Youth Parliament shall have a minimum of 200 and 276 maximum as members. The members of Youth Parliamentarians representing their various District, Municipal or Metropolitan Youth Parliaments in their respective Regional Youth Parliaments shall build a consensus to nominate one or two persons to represent them depending on the number of constituencies in the district for any particular given sitting of the house at the National level taking into consideration persons with disability and female representation. The District, Municipal or Metropolitan Youth Parliament members shall be changing their representatives to the National Youth Parliament to give an opportunity to others to have a feel of the house.
